True Grit may refer to:

Fiction
 True Grit (novel), a 1968 novel by Charles Portis
 True Grit (1969 film), a film adaptation by Henry Hathaway, starring John Wayne
 True Grit (2010 film), a film adaptation by the Coen Brothers, starring Jeff Bridges

Music
 True Grit (1969 soundtrack), by Glen Campbell and Elmer Bernstein
 "True Grit" (song), the album's title track
 True Grit (2010 soundtrack), by Carter Burwell
 True Grit (Bret Michaels album), 2015
 "True Grit", a song by the Crystal Method from Legion of Boom, 2004

Other uses
 True Grit (mascot), at University of Maryland, Baltimore County, US

See also
 True Grit: A Further Adventure, a 1978 made-for-TV sequel
 Grit (disambiguation)